M Harun-Ar-Rashid (born 15 February 1948) is a retired Bangladesh Army general who served as the  Chief of Army Staff of the Bangladesh Army from 24 December 2000 – 16 June 2002. The Bangladesh government awarded him the title of Bir Pratik for his bravery in the war of independence.

Military career
Harun-Ar-Rashid was commissioned in infantry on 6 September  1970 from 24 War Course of PMA.Rashid was made army Chief on 24 December 2000, taking over from General Mustafizur Rahman. He was the army chief when one British and two Danish surveyors were kidnapped in Chittagong Hill tracts by suspected tribal unsatisfied with the peace deal.
Rashid was the first president of Army Golf club.

Post-military career
Rashid is the vice president of Sector Commanders forum. In 2015 he accused Pakistan of “threatening our national security”. He supported increased government expenditure on defense but believed health and housing should get a higher priority.

Rashid was the president of Destiny Group. He was arrested when Destiny was accused of fraud and irregularities. He was granted bail on the grounds of "Health" and "Social Status".

Bibliography
"Bijoyer Pothe" is on the Bangladesh Liberation War.

References

External links
 

Living people
Chiefs of Army Staff, Bangladesh
Pakistan Military Academy alumni
Bangladesh Army generals
People from Hathazari Upazila
1948 births
Recipients of the Bir Protik
Mukti Bahini personnel